Matt Harvie (born 7 June 1984) is a New Zealand former cricketer. He played 26 first-class and 14 List A matches for Otago between 2004 and 2010.

See also
 List of Otago representative cricketers

References

External links
 

1984 births
Living people
New Zealand cricketers
Otago cricketers
Cricketers from Dunedin